Ein Rafa ( or) is an Arab village ten kilometers west of Jerusalem in Israel. Located on the other side of Route 1 to Abu Ghosh, it falls under the jurisdiction of Mateh Yehuda Regional Council.

History
Ein Rafa was founded in the 1940s when the Barhom family moved from the nearby village of Suba into the valley. It expanded after 1948 when several other families left Suba and settled there. Most of the residents of the village are descended from the Barhom family. In 2007, there was controversy when one home built without a permit was demolished in the village.

Education and culture
In a co-existence project in Ein Rafa, children and teachers from the local school meet with Jewish children for joint activities in which they share food and games and become more trusting of one another.

Gallery

See also
Arab localities in Israel
Arab-Israeli peace projects
Population displacements in Israel after 1948
Tawfeek Barhom

References

External links

Arab villages in Israel
Populated places in Jerusalem District
1940s establishments in Mandatory Palestine
Populated places established in the 1940s